Gać is a village in Przeworsk County, Subcarpathian Voivodeship, in south-eastern Poland. It is the seat of the gmina (administrative district) called Gmina Gać.

The village has a population of 1,550.

See also
 Walddeutsche

References

Villages in Przeworsk County